Peytona is an unincorporated community in Boone County, West Virginia, United States. Peytona has a post office with ZIP code 25154.

History
As early as 1000 CE, Native Americans inhabited present-day Peytona. In 1742, John Peter Salley discovered coal while on an expedition in the vicinity. Peytona was named for William Madison Peyton, who promoted coal mining and navigation on Coal River. A lawyer and landowner from a distinguished Virginia family, Peyton served as chief executive of the Coal River Navigation Company, which locked and dammed the river during the 1840s. As a result, steamboats could navigate the Coal River and transport coal to larger markets. Peyton was also instrumental in the formation of Boone County, organized in 1847 from Kanawha, Cabell, and Logan counties. In 1906, Madison was named the county seat, honoring the same man.

Recreation
Peytona is home of Drawdy Falls Park.

Notable person
 John E. Kenna, twice elected U.S. Senator for West Virginia

References

Unincorporated communities in Boone County, West Virginia
Unincorporated communities in West Virginia